Baglan is a village in Nookat District of Osh Region of Kyrgyzstan. Its population was 1,953 in 2021.

References 

Populated places in Osh Region